The following highways are numbered 12F:

United States
 Nebraska Spur 12F
 New York State Route 12F
 Secondary State Highway 12F (Washington) (former)

See also
List of highways numbered 12